Airdrie is a town in North Lanarkshire, Scotland. It lies on a plateau roughly 400 ft (130 m) above sea level, and is approximately 12 miles (19 km) east of Glasgow city centre. , the town had a population of around 37,130. Historically part of Lanarkshire, Airdrie forms part of a conurbation with its neighbour Coatbridge, in what is commonly known as the Monklands, formerly a district. (population approximately 90,000 including outlying settlements).

Name
Airdrie's name first appeared in the Register of the Great Seal of Scotland (Registrum Magni Sigilii Regum Scotorum) in 1373 as Ardre. By 1546 it had become Ardry and by 1587 it was known as Ardrie. In 1630 it finally appeared in the Register as Airdrie. Given the topography of the area, the most likely interpretation is that the name derives from the Gaelic An Àrd Ruigh meaning a level height or high pasture land. Another possibility is that it is from the Gaelic An Àrd Àirighe meaning a sheiling, a summer pasture/shepherd's hut. A third possibility is the Gaelic Ard Reidh meaning a high plain. A further, non-Gaelic alternative is the Brythonic, i.e. Cumbric or North Welsh, ard tref (becoming ardre by process of assimilation), meaning a high steading or farmstead, which would date back to the times of the Kingdom of Strathclyde, before the expansion of Gaelic or English speech into the region. Airthrey Castle in Stirlingshire may have a similar derivation.

Geography

Satellite villages
Chapelhall, Calderbank, Caldercruix, Gartness, Glenmavis, Greengairs, Longriggend, Plains, Stand, Upperton, Newhouse and Wattston are generally considered satellite villages of Airdrie.

Wards
Since the most recent major reorganisation in 2006, North Lanarkshire Council divides Airdrie into the following wards, each electing four councillors since the 2017 election:

 Ward 7 – Airdrie North (2019 population 20,137): Glenmavis, Caldercruix, Plains, Burnfoot, Thrashbush, Rochsoles, Holehills, Clarkston, Greengairs, Longriggend
 Ward 8 – Airdrie Central (2019 population 16,354): Airdrie Town Centre, Whinhall, Coatdyke, Gartlea, North Cairnhill, Central Park Area, Rawyards
 Ward 11 – Airdrie South (2019 population 19,934): Craignuek, Petersburn, Moffat Mills, Chapelhall, Calderbank, Brownsburn, South Cairnhill, Gartness

History

Early history

There is no evidence to support the claim (George Chalmers, Caledonia) that Airdrie is the site of the ancient battle of Arderyth. Under the patronage of King Malcolm IV of Scotland Cistercian monks established an abbey at Melrose in 1136. Five years later a daughter house was founded at Newbattle Abbey in Lothian. In 1160, Malcolm granted lands in central Scotland to the monks of Newbattle. These became known as the "Munklands" (Register of the Great Seal 1323).

Malcolm's Charter constitutes the oldest documentary record of place-names in the Monklands. The area of land granted by the Charter is clearly defined by direct reference to geographical and topographical features thus: Dunpeldre by its right boundaries, namely with Metheraugh and Mayeuth and Clarnephin as far as Dunduffes in the east. The name Dunpeldre is found in the modern name Drumpellier, Metheraugh is Medrox; Mayeuth is Myvot and Clarnephin refers to the North Calder Water in the east of the parish (from old Brittonic name claur n afon meaning plain of the river). Dunduffes has become directly translated into the modern Black Hill which, as the Charter states, lies at the eastern extremity of the parish. The Charter does not mention anything resembling Airdrie, although this is where Airdrie is located.

Airdrie owes its existence to its location on the 'Hogs Back' – a ridge of land running from east to west. One very important aspect of the town's history was the Cistercian monks of Newbattle Abbey, which is why the area is called the Monklands. The monks were farmers and some of their place names survive, e.g., Ryefield and Whifflet (the wheat flats). Much of the land they used is known today as 'The Four Isles' (a housing estate named after four Scottish islands): Mull, Islay, Iona and Luing in the Petersburn area of modern Airdrie.  The monks of Newbattle had numerous establishments throughout the area including a farm grange at Drumpellier, Coatbridge, a court house at Kipps, a chapel in the area of Chapelhall and a number of corn mills. The Monks were also expert in the construction of roads. In the 12th century, they established the original Glasgow to Edinburgh road via Airdrie and Bathgate, to link up with their lands in Newbattle in East Lothian.

Definitive evidence of the existence of Airdrie as a tenantry was only made clear in 1503. The old monks' road was via Cliftonhill (an area now in neighbouring Coatbridge), Airdrie House (now the site of Monklands Hospital), Aitchison Street, High Street, Hallcraig Street, Flowerhill Street and Colliertree Road. The first houses in Airdrie were built along this road. Development was slow and it was only around 1650 that evidence of the number of inhabitants was known at around 500 for the Airdrie area. A large contingent of Airdrieonians fought at the Battle of Bothwell Brig during the Covenanter Rebellion of 1679; their banner can still be viewed at the local library.

A significant event in Airdrie's history was the 1695 passing of a special Act of Parliament in the Scottish Parliament allowing Robert Hamilton of Airdrie to hold four fairs yearly and a weekly market in the town of 'Airdry'. This helped develop Airdrie from a 'farm town' into a thriving 'market town'.

However, Airdrie really came to prominence through its weaving industry. Airdrie Weavers Society was founded in 1781 and flax was being grown in sixteen farms in and around the burgh. In the last decade of the eighteenth century, coal mining was in progress and around thirty colliers were employed. Weaving continued to flourish making up a substantial part of the population of over 2,500 around the turn of the 19th century.

Given its large number of weavers, its geographic location and a large number of unemployed soldiers following the end of the Napoleonic Wars, Airdrie became a major centre of support for the Radical War of 1820. The rapid pace of population growth continued and by 1821 there were 4,862 inhabitants. At this time, the number of houses being built increased dramatically and in 1821, by a private Act of Parliament, Airdrie became a free and independent Burgh of Barony.

Voting in the early part of the nineteenth century was rather hit or miss as not only locals but residents outside the burgh were allowed to vote. In 1821, the first election of a town council took place and by August it had appointed an assessor, procurator fiscal, master of police and a town crier. Anyone who had paid their 3 guineas was allowed to vote; there is even a record of a John Mackay voting despite being under 10 years old.

In 1824, it was decided to build the Airdrie Town House, originally designed by Alexander Baird and now a local landmark known as the 'town clock'. In 1832, the Town House was used as a hospital due to the cholera outbreak of this year.

1850 to 1920

The enormous growth in population was not due to high birthrate, but instead due to an influx of residents from the Highlands and predominantly Ireland. This followed the Highland potato famine of the mid-1840s and also reflected the change from cottage industry to heavy industry in the area. Most of the Irish immigrant population were involved with mining and labouring.
This led to an increase in ironwork foundries around the area. Because of this explosion in industry, railway links were established starting in 1826. By 1862, the Airdrie and Bathgate Junction Railway provided a direct link to Edinburgh with Airdrie South Station providing the starting point for trains to Glasgow.

In August the Public Libraries Act (Scotland) 1853 was passed, and in November Airdrie Public Library became the first in Scotland.

The dramatic rise in population and industry prompted the need for more accessible water supplies. Until the mid-1800s, various wells were put in place feeding from surrounding streams in the area. These served to provide many houses with private wells. By 1846 Airdrie and Coatbridge Water Company was founded to construct (along with Forth and Clyde Canal Company) the reservoir at Roughrigg.

Journalism in Airdrie began with "The Airdrie Literary Album" in 1828. Several local newspapers began appearing around this time notably the Airdrie & Coatbridge Advertiser in 1855, which is still the most popular local paper today. The prison was legalised in 1859 and had 51 cells.

Airdrie Working Men's Club was established in 1869. Also around this time, football and cricket began to emerge as popular sports. Following the codification of association football rules a local team called Excelsior was formed in 1878 which would later be renamed Airdrieonians. Horse race meetings were also held in the town (1851–1870) but this land became the golf course for the newly formed Airdrie Golf Club in 1877.

Education posed a major problem with severe overcrowding in the few schools available, therefore three new school boards were established. In the early 1830s there were about 800 pupils while the town had about 7000 residents. Fees were routinely charged within the schools with the belief they should be self-supporting until a parliamentary act of 1889 relieved some of the infant classes in schools of this burden. Airdrie Academy was built in 1849 and by 1919 all school boards were dissolved and Lanarkshire Education Authority took over responsibility for education throughout Lanarkshire.

Airdrie Public Observatory, one of only four public observatories in the UK (Second Oldest and Smallest)- all in Scotland, was founded in the first library building in 1896, and is still operated in the present building by the Airdrie Astronomical Association a Scottish astronautic and astronomy society and registered charity.

By the turn of the century variety shows were becoming popular in the area and by 1911 the Pavilion in Graham Street was built which after initially being used as a music hall started showing cinematographic pictures. Unfortunately it was destroyed by fire in 1917 but was rebuilt in 1919 and finally closed in 1970. The New Cinema was opened in 1920 in Broomknoll Street but it too has since closed. The town had no suitable venue for larger functions so in 1912 the Sir John Wilson Town Hall was opened (following an offer of £10,000 from Sir John Wilson).

On 9 July 1918 nineteen miners died in the Stanrigg Pit Disaster. The pit was situated in boggy land and collapsed after being saturated by heavy rainfall.

1920 onwards

At the end of the First World War, Airdrie was hard hit with many casualties from the war. Unemployment reached 30% in the local area. After years of moving from one site to another, the first purpose built library in Airdrie was opened in Anderson Street in 1895. However, this only lasted 30 years until the current Airdrie Library building was erected in 1925.

Conditions in the town did not really improve until well after the Second World War but in 1949 the Boots pharmaceutical company and Banner Textiles Ltd were attracted to the town (between them employing 1200). With this impetus, new companies began to consider Airdrie as a viable option for business and in 1958 Pye opened employing over 1000 people. The emergence of industrial estates was also prevalent around this time (Newhouse, Chapelhall, and Brownsburn). The Airdrie Arts Centre opened in 1967 in the former Airdrie Library building, and was a popular venue for concerts and plays, but was closed in 2012 by North Lanarkshire Council.

Between 1964 and 1991, the town was the location of a Royal Observer Corps monitoring bunker, to be used in the event of a nuclear attack. No trace remains today.

The 1970s saw the opening of Monklands Hospital, which replaced an older hospital on the Airdrie House estate. Airdrie hosted the National Mòd in 1993.

Sport

Angling
Airdrie is a popular destination for anglers from across the Central Belt, due to its lochs and reservoirs. These include: Airdrie & District Angling Club based at Hillend Loch.

Athletics
Airdrie Harriers, one of North Lanarkshire's athletics clubs.

Football

The town's major football club is Airdrieonians F.C., who play in the Scottish League One, and are based at the Excelsior Stadium. They were formed as a replacement for the original Airdrieonians, who folded in May 2002.

Golf
Airdrie Golf Club was established in 1877. It is a wooded parkland par 69 course with tight fairways and well-protected greens.

Motor sport
The Monklands Sporting Car Club runs its events at the Forrestburn Hillclimb situated about 5 miles east of Airdrie.

Rugby union
Airdrie was home to its own rugby union team called Waysiders RFC. This team was amalgamated to form Waysiders Drumpellier RFC which currently play out of Drumpellier RFC's traditional home ground in Langloan, Coatbridge.

Sailing
The Monklands Sailing Club is based at Hillend Loch by Caldercruix.

Tennis
Springwells Lawn Tennis Club. A member of the West of Scotland District and LTA County, divisions of Tennis Scotland.

Culture

Places of interest
Airdrie Public Library
Airdrie Public Observatory
Arran View - villa built by Alexander Thomson in 1867.
Black Hill transmitting station
Centenary and West End Parks – including the Airdrie Cenotaph
Monkland Canal – where the Vulcan, the world's first iron boat, was constructed and launched in 1819.
New Monklands Parish Church
The Wallace Stone – legend tells that William Wallace sharpened his sword on this stone on his way to the Battle of Falkirk.

Organisations
The Moira Anderson Foundation, a national charity providing support for those affected by childhood sexual abuse

Governance

Airdrie is represented by several tiers of elected government. North Lanarkshire Council, the unitary local authority for Airdrie, is based at Motherwell, and is the executive, deliberative and legislative body responsible for local governance. The Scottish Parliament is responsible for devolved matters such as education, health and justice, while reserved matters are dealt with by the Parliament of the United Kingdom.

Westminster
The town forms part of the burgh constituency of Airdrie and Shotts, electing one Member of Parliament (MP) to the House of Commons. In 2005, changes to the constituency boundaries saw part of its area transferred to Motherwell and Wishaw, offset by the addition of part of Hamilton North and Bellshill.

The location has been represented by several prominent Labour MPs in recent years:
John Smith, MP for North Lanarkshire 1970–1983 and Monklands East 1983–1994 (Eastern Coatbridge and Airdrie area). Former Shadow Chancellor and then leader of the Labour Party until his untimely death in 1994.
Helen Liddell, MP for Monklands East 1994–1997, Airdrie and Shotts 1997–2005, Secretary of State for Scotland and subsequently Britain's High Commissioner to Australia.
John Reid, MP for Airdrie and Shotts 2005–2010, a high-profile minister including as the first Roman Catholic to be appointed Secretary of State for Northern Ireland.
The current MP for the constituency is the Scottish National Party's Anum Qaisar.

Scottish Parliament
For the purposes of the Scottish Parliament, Airdrie forms part of the Airdrie and Shotts constituency.  This has slightly different boundaries from those of the UK Parliament constituency of the same name.  The current Member of the Scottish Parliament (MSP) for Airdrie and Shotts is Neil Grey MSP (Scottish National Party), who won this seat in 2021.

In addition to this, Airdrie is represented by seven regional MSPs from the Central Scotland electoral region.

European Parliament
Before Brexit, it was part of the Scotland European Parliament constituency.

Local government
Up until 1975, Airdrie had its own Burgh Council. Between 1975 and 1996, Airdrie came under Monklands District Council operating in conjunction with Strathclyde Regional Council. Monklands District Council was headquartered in the Coatbridge Municipal Building. Many Airdrieonians felt short-changed by MDC's actions and a significant political scandal known as Monklandsgate greatly tarnished the council's reputation. After 1996, it came under the authority of the unitary North Lanarkshire Council. North Lanarkshire has many councillors; currently, the council is in control of the Labour group and the leader of the council is Jim Logue, councillor for Airdrie Central.

Law

Police

Policing in Airdrie is undertaken by Police Scotland. Airdrie is part of Coatbridge Area Command with Chief Inspector Kenny MacLeod as the Area Commander. Airdrie also forms part of NA (or Monklands) sub division which includes Coatbridge and the surrounding area. There is one police office in Airdrie and this is open 24 hours.

Sheriff Court
Airdrie Sheriff Court provides a comprehensive local court service for the area including civil actions and criminal cases. It is administered by the Scottish Court Service and part of the South Strathclyde, Dumfries and Galloway Sheriffdom headed by a Sheriff Principal.

Other
The Crown Office and Procurator Fiscal Service, responsible for the prosecution of crime in Scotland, maintains an office in the town directly opposite the Court.
The Airdrie Hearing Centre holds Children's Hearings within the town. The centre is part of the Central West Region of the Scottish Children's Reporter Administration.

Economy

Overview

As outlined in the history section, Airdrie's traditional economic activities of weaving, coal mining, and heavy industry have ceased to exist. Although the Glenflagler Distillery is now closed, the town still retains a strong involvement in the whisky industry. Airdrie was also home to a Crimpy Crisps factory. Given its location near to Glasgow and other commercial or industrial areas, Airdrie might now be considered something of a commuter town. In fact, housing construction in Airdrie has been very prominent in recent years, with builders developing a number of brownfield sites following the closure of various factories such as Boots (who closed their factory in 2004). Nonetheless, it does retain significant economic activity.

Notable employers
Albert Bartlett & Sons, a supplier of root vegetables in the UK. The Bartlett brothers, Alan, 52, and Ronnie, 44 are jointly ranked in The Sunday Times Rich List 2008 as the 63rd richest persons in Scotland and the 969th richest persons in the UK with a worth valued at £80 million.
Inver House Distillers Limited, headquarters and warehousing in Airdrie. Products include Old Pulteney, Balblair, Heather Cream and Coldstream Gin.

Former notable employers
Teleperformance, a telesales and technical support company. Ceased operation December 2021.

There are two trading estates in the town, Brownsburn Industrial Estate and Osprey Trade Park.

Demography
Historical records of Airdrie's population are available from the 18th, the early decades of the 19th century, and into the early 20th century.

According to the 2001 Census, Airdrie's population of 36,326 was:
47.31 male, 52.69% female.
20.7% were under 16, 16.67% were pensioners.
46.61% were married (first marriage), 29.81% were single.
95.74% were born in Scotland or described their nationality as Scottish.
0.42% spoke Gaelic.

Religion
Christian
Church of Scotland – Airdrie's Church of Scotland churches are part of the Presbytery of Hamilton.

Cairnlea Church - formed by the amalgamation of Broomknoll Church and Flowerhill Church in 2016 and housed in the former Flowerhill building (1875)
Clarkston Church (1837)
High Church
Jackson Church
New Monkland Parish Church (bef. 1698) – In nearby Glenmavis.
New Wellwynd (1834)
St Columba's Church

Roman Catholic Church – Airdrie's Roman Catholic churches are immediately governed by the Diocese of Motherwell, currently led by Bishop Joseph Toal. The Bishops' Conference of Scotland (effectively the Church's headquarters in Scotland) is situated in Airdrie.
St Andrew's Church (Whinhall)
St Edward's Church (Gartlea)
St Margaret's Church (Airdrie centre)
St Serf's Church (Rawyards)

Congregational Church – Airdrie's Congregational churches are associated with the Congregational Federation.
Coatdyke Church
Ebenezer Church (Broomknoll Street) (1882)
Pilgrim Church

Other

Airdrie Baptist Church (1843) – part of the Baptist Union of Scotland.
Airdrie Islamic Centre (mosque) – part of the UK Islamic Mission.
Airdrie Park – part of the United Reformed Church.
Airdrie Reformed Presbyterian Church – part of the Reformed Presbyterian Church of Scotland, which is largely headquartered in Airdrie.
The Church of Jesus Christ of the Latter-Day Saints Chapel
Ebenezer Church (Aitchison Street) – Evangelical Church – Airdrie's Evangelical churches are Brethren and associated with the Evangelical Alliance.
Jehovah's Witnesses' Kingdom Hall
The Salvation Army, Airdrie Corps
St Andrew's Hospice – operated by the Sisters of Charity.
St Paul & St John the Baptist – part of the Scottish Episcopal Church, governed by the Diocese of Glasgow and Galloway.

Transport
Airdrie railway station is on the electrified North Clyde Line. Drumgelloch railway station serves the eastern end of the town.

Airdrie has road links to Glasgow, Edinburgh, Livingston, Motherwell, and Cumbernauld and is situated close to the M8 motorway. Bus services are largely undertaken by local operators, and links to Glasgow are provided by First Glasgow and McGills. McGill's took over most of the local companies in 2016 to form its 'Monklands' network in Go Zone 8. The services link all the local neighbourhoods with longer distance services e.g. the 212 from Coatbridge - Caldercruix via Airdrie and Plains, or the 247 from Monklands Hospital - Kirkintilloch via Airdrie, Glenmavis, Cumbernauld and Blackwood.

Airdrie is connected to the UK National Cycle Network by National Cycle Route 75. This route provides a path between Glasgow and Edinburgh. According to the Sustrans website: "there is currently a gap in the National Cycle Network route at Devol Glen, Port Glasgow." Other than the Sustrans path, there are no cycle lanes in Airdrie.

Historical transport links include:-
Monkland Canal, 1794, commenced by James Watt
Airdrie and Coatbridge Tramways
Ballochney Railway, 1828
Monkland and Kirkintilloch Railway, 1826
Slamannan Railway
Monkland Railways, formed in 1848 by the merger of the aforesaid local "coal railways".
Edinburgh and Glasgow Railway
North British Railway
Caledonian Railway
London and North Eastern Railway (LNER)
London, Midland and Scottish Railway
British Railways/British Rail -  Scottish Region of British Railways

Healthcare

Airdrie is home to Monklands District General Hospital with a 24-hour Accident & Emergency department.

Adjacent to Monklands Hospital is Maggie's Lanarkshire, part of the Maggie's Centres cancer support charity.

Education
The following are the secondary schools, all of which are run by North Lanarkshire Council:

Airdrie Academy – Non-denominational, co-educational, comprehensive school
Caldervale High – Non-denominational, co-educational, comprehensive school
St Margaret's High – Roman Catholic, co-educational, comprehensive school

International relations

Twin towns - sister cities 
  Arnhem, Gelderland, Netherlands
  Füssen, Bavaria, Germany

Notable people
Anton Danyluk - Love Island 2019 participant
Ian Aitken - political journalist
Bill Adam – racing driver
Joe Allen - painter
Ian Bannen – actor
John Carmichael – soldier and recipient of the Victoria Cross 
Reece Clarke – ballet dancer
John Craig – geologist and lexicographer
Paul Craig - Mixed Martial Artist
Leo Cushley – Roman Catholic archbishop of St Andrews and Edinburgh
William Whigham Fletcher - biologist
Hugh de Largie – Australian politician
The Big Dish – pop/rock band
Ryan Dalziel – racing driver
Ross Davidson – actor
Nathan Evans - singer
Emily Gerard – writer, whose works inspired Bram Stoker's Dracula and coined the term Nosferatu
John Graham, 1st Viscount of Dundee – also known as 'Bluidy Clavers' and 'Bonnie Dundee'. Royalist and Jacobite soldier
Walker Hamilton – writer
Dee Hepburn – actress, best known for her role in Gregory's Girl
David Keenan – writer, musician 
Jim Lambie – Turner Prize nominated artist.
David Ross Lauder – soldier and recipient of the Victoria Cross
Jason Leitch - National Clinical Director for Scotland. Dux of Airdrie Academy
Sir George G. Macfarlane, engineer, scientific administrator and public servant.
Alesha MacPhail, murder victim
John O'Neill – soldier and recipient of the Victoria Cross.
James Bell Pettigrew
William Robinson – swimmer, won silver in the Men's 200 metre Breaststroke at the 1908 Olympics in London.
Jim Traynor – sports broadcaster and journalist.
Sir John Wilson – Baronet (Wilson Baronetcy of Airdrie, which continues today with the 5th Baronet).
Amanda Hendrick – high-fashion model
Grant Harrold – broadcaster, and former Royal butler to HRH Prince Charles and The Duchess of Cornwall
Kenny Williams – Scottish professional wrestler with Insane Championship Wrestling

Footballers
John Armstrong
Barry Bannan
Dick Black
George Brown
Jackie Campbell
Sandy Clark
Bobby Cumming
Torrance Gillick
Dick Hendrie
Drew Jarvie
Alan Lawrence – Nicknamed 'Nipper'.
Brian McClair
Bob McFarlane
John McGregor
Ian McMillan
Robert Main
Alan Morton – Nicknamed 'The Wee Blue Devil'.
Billy Neil - Olympian
Ally Roy
Matthew Scott
Gardner Speirs
James White
Martin Woods

Climate

See also
List of places in North Lanarkshire

Sources
Begg, E. and Rich, D. (1991) On the Trail of Merlin. 
Geddes, C.M. (1995) Airdrie 300:A Souvenir Brochure. Motherwell: Monklands Library Services. 
Hutton, G. (1997) Lanarkshire's Mining Legacy. Catrine: Stenlake Publishing. 
McCutcheon, C. (1994) Old Airdrie. Catrine: Stenlake Publishing. 
Moir, H. (2001) Airdrie. Stroud: Tempus Publishing Ltd. 
Scobbie, J.K. (1985) Book of Airdrie'''. Motherwell: Monklands Library Services. 
Wilson, R. (1997) Old Airdrie Villages''. Catrine: Stenlake Publishing.

References

External links

Airdrie web page The Airdrie page (no longer maintained)
 A collection of historic maps of Airdrie from the 1830s onward at National Library of Scotland

 
Towns in North Lanarkshire
Burghs